This is a list of television shows set in the Greater Los Angeles Area (including Los Angeles and Orange County communities such as Beverly Hills, Santa Monica, Malibu, and Newport Beach).

0–100
 10 Things I Hate About You
 100 Deeds for Eddie McDowd
 24
 The 45 Rules of Divorce
 1000 Ways to Die
 77 Sunset Strip
 90210 (Beverly Hills)
 9-1-1

A

B

C

D

E
 E! News
 East Los High
 El Talismán
 Ellen
 Emergency!
 Entourage
 Episodes
 Eva Luna

F
 The Fall Guy
 Family
 Family Feud
 Famous in Love
 Fashion House
 Fast Times
 Fastlane
 Fat Actress
 Fear the Walking Dead
 Flaked (Venice)
 FlashForward
 The Flight Attendant (Season 2)
 The Fluffer
 Franklin and Bash
 The Fresh Prince of Bel-Air

G

H
 The Handler
 Hannah Montana (Malibu)
 Happily Divorced
 Hardcastle & McCormick
 Harukana Receive (Manhattan Beach)
 HeartBeat (1988 TV series)
 Heartbeat (2016 TV series)
 Hell Date
 Hello Ladies
 Heroes (season 1 scenes involving Greg Grunberg's character, Matt Parkman; regular in season 2)
 The Heirs (San Diego, Redlands, Huntington Beach, Malibu and Kim Tan’s Mansion)
 Hidden Hills
 The Hills
 Hollywood 7
 House of Lies
 Hunter

I
 I Dream of Jeannie (Burbank)
 I'm in the Band
 I'm Dying Up Here
 I'm Sorry
 Insecure
 In the House
 The Inside
 It's Garry Shandling's Show (Sherman Oaks)
 It's a Living

J
 Jackass
 The Jamie Foxx Show
 Jarian Mitchell
 Jeopardy! (Culver City)
 The Jerry Springer Show
 Joey
 Jonas
 Jane the Virgin (Manhattan Beach, California)
 Judge Judy (Hollywood)
 Julie and the Phantoms
 Just Jordan (Hollywood)
 Just Legal (Santa Monica)
 Justice

K
 Kamen Rider: Dragon Knight
 Keeping Up with the Kardashians
 Kentucky Jones (set in an unidentified location in Southern California)
 Kingdom
 Knots Landing (set in a fictitious town of the same name in Los Angeles County)

L

M

N
 The Naked Truth (TV series)
 Nathan For You
 NCIS: Los Angeles
 The New Adam-12
 The New Adventures of Old Christine
 New Attitude
 The New Dragnet
 The New Gidget (Santa Monica)
 New Girl
 The New Normal
 The New Phil Silvers Show
 Newport Harbor
 Newton's Cradle (Long Beach)
 No Ordinary Family
 Notes from the Underbelly
 Now Apocalypse
 Numbers
 Noah's Arc (TV series)

O
 On the Lot One Day at a Time (2017 TV series) One on One (season 5)
 Operation Repo Out All Night On My BlockP
 Pacific Blue (Santa Monica)
 Pacific Palisades The Parkers (Santa Monica)
 Party Down Pasadena (Pasadena)
 Perry Mason (CBS, 1957)
 Perry Mason (HBO, 2020)
 Pet Shop of Horrors (Chinatown)
 Police Woman Popular Postcards from Buster (season 1) (PBS Kids GO) (East Los Angeles) ( Los Angeles)
 Power Rangers (seasons 1-10)
 The Price Is Right (Hollywood)
 Private Practice The ProtectorQ
 Quincy, M.E.R

S

T
 T.J. Hooker (this story was about the fictitious "LCPD", but it was filmed in Los Angeles)
 The Tab Hunter Show (Malibu)
 Tabitha Tenafly Tenspeed and Brown Shoe Terminator: The Sarah Connor Chronicles Them Three's Company (Santa Monica)
 The Tim Conway Show Togetherness The Tonight Show (Burbank, 1972 until 2014)
 Too Old to Die Young Top Chef (Season 2)
 Top Design 
 Torchwood: Miracle Day Totally Spies! (fictional town of World Organization Of Human Protection (WOOHP)), (Beverly Hills in seasons 1-6, fictional Malibu University since season 5)
 Transparent Two and a Half Men (Malibu)

U
 Up All Night UEFA Champions LeagueV
 V (Two miniseries and then TV series)Vanderpump RulesVictorious (fictional school of Hollywood Arts, Los Angeles)Viva Valdez The VoiceW
 Watching Ellie Weeds (fictional town of Agrestic)
 What About Brian What's Happening!! (Watts)
 Wheel of Fortune (Culver City)
 Where My Dogs At? The White Shadow Who Wants to Be a Millionaire? Wilfred (Venice)
 Winning Time: The Rise of the Lakers DynastyXX-PlayY
 Yes, Dear The Young and the Restless You're the Worst You (Season 2)

Z
 Zoey 101 Zorro (1957)
 Zorro: La Espada y la Rosa''

See also

 List of movies set in Los Angeles
 Lists of television shows by city setting

Los Angeles
Television shows set in Los Angeles

Television shows set in Los Angeles